Cyperus sandwicensis, commonly known as the cliffs flatsedge, is a species of sedge that is endemic to Hawaii.

The species was first formally described by the botanist Georg Kükenthal in 1920.

See also
List of Cyperus species

References

sandwicensis
Taxa named by Georg Kükenthal
Plants described in 1920
Flora of Hawaii